Gennadi Sardanashvily (March 13, 1950 – September 1, 2016) was a theoretical physicist, a principal research scientist of Moscow State University.

Biography 
Gennadi Sardanashvily graduated from Moscow State University (MSU) in 1973, he was a Ph.D. student of  the Department of Theoretical Physics (MSU) in 1973–76, where he held a position in 1976.

He attained his Ph.D. degree in physics and mathematics from MSU, in 1980, with Dmitri Ivanenko as his supervisor, and his D.Sc. degree in physics and mathematics from MSU, in 1998.

Gennadi Sardanashvily was the founder and Managing Editor (2003 - 2013) of the International Journal of Geometric Methods in Modern Physics (IJGMMP).

He was a member of Lepage Research Institute (Czech Republic).

Research area

Gennadi Sardanashvily research area is geometric method in classical and quantum mechanics and field theory, gravitation theory. His main achievement is geometric formulation of classical field theory and non-autonomous mechanics including:

 gauge gravitation theory, where gravity is treated as a classical Higgs field associated to a reduced Lorentz structure on a world manifold
 geometric formulation of classical field theory and Lagrangian BRST theory where classical fields are represented by sections of fiber bundles and their dynamics is described in terms of jet manifolds and the variational bicomplex (covariant classical field theory)
 covariant (polysymplectic) Hamiltonian field theory, where momenta correspond to derivatives of fields with respect to all world coordinates
 the second Noether theorem in a very general setting of reducible degenerate Grassmann-graded Lagrangian systems on an arbitrary manifold
 geometric formulation of classical and quantum  non-autonomous mechanics on fiber bundles over 
 generalization of the Liouville–Arnold, Nekhoroshev and Mishchenko–Fomenko theorems on  completely and partially integrable and superintegrable Hamiltonian systems to the case of non-compact invariant submanifolds
 cohomology of the variational bicomplex of graded differential forms of finite jet order on an infinite order jet manifold.

Gennadi Sardanashvily has published more than 400 scientific works, including 28 books.

Selected monographs 
.

.

.

.

.

.

.

.

.

.

.

.

.

References

External links 
 Personal page at Moscow State University (in Russian)
  Gennadi Sardanashvily's personal site
  Gennadi Sardanashvily's site at Google
 Scientific Biography
 List of publications at ResearchGate

1950 births
2016 deaths
Russian physicists
Academic staff of Moscow State University
Theoretical physicists
Moscow State University alumni